Sisti is a surname. Notable people with this surname include:

 Giancarlo De Sisti (born 1943), retired Italian footballer and football manager and midfielder
 Anthony J. (Tony) Sisti (1901–1983), American artist, art instructor and patron of the arts
 Michael Sisti , American women's ice hockey current head coach at Mercyhurst University.
 Michelan Sisti (born 1949), Puerto Rican-American actor, director, puppeteer, and musician
 Romeo Sisti, Italian rower
 Sebastian Daniel "Sibby" Sisti (1920–2006), American Major League Baseball utility player
 Vittorio De Sisti (1940-2006), Libyan-born Italian director and screenwriter